Nabam Tempol (born 25 September 1994) is an Indian cricketer. He made his Twenty20 debut on 12 November 2019, for Arunachal Pradesh in the 2019–20 Syed Mushtaq Ali Trophy. He made his first-class debut on 3 January 2020, for Arunachal Pradesh in the 2019–20 Ranji Trophy. He made his List A debut on 25 February 2021, for Arunachal Pradesh in the 2020–21 Vijay Hazare Trophy.

References

External links
 

1994 births
Living people
Indian cricketers
Arunachal Pradesh cricketers
Place of birth missing (living people)